Tate Liverpool is an art gallery and museum in Liverpool, Merseyside, England, and part of Tate, along with Tate St Ives, Cornwall,  Tate Britain, London, and Tate Modern, London. The museum was an initiative of the Merseyside Development Corporation. Tate Liverpool was created to display work from the Tate Collection which comprises the national collection of British art from the year 1500 to the present day, and  international modern art. The gallery also has a programme of temporary exhibitions. Until 2003, Tate Liverpool was the largest gallery of modern and contemporary art in the UK outside London.

History

Housed in a converted warehouse within the Albert Dock on Liverpool's waterfront, the gallery was opened on 24 May 1988 by Prince Charles, an event covered by BBC Two television. The original conversion was done by James Stirling but the building was given a major refurbishment in 1998 to create additional gallery space.

In 2007, the foyer area was redesigned by architects Arca to create an updated appearance and better proportions, as well as to improve visitor handling. The gallery cafe was also redesigned by Peter Blake and Liverpool-based architects, Architectural Emporium. The centrepiece of the space is a new timber desk with an undulating orange fascia, which links to the retained colour scheme of the original conversion work by Stirling. A colour-changing wall acts as a backdrop to the simplified brick volume, visible from across Albert Dock. Behind the scenes, Arca also made alterations to the hospitality, cloakroom, events and education areas.

Renovation
The gallery will close in October 2023 for two years whilst renovation work takes place. Costing around £29.7 million, the works will see the galleries refurbished and the creation of new social spaces. During this period, the gallery plans to host events and projects in other areas around the city.

Live events 
The gallery has hosted numerous live events in the foyer, including Made Up Mix as part of Liverpool's Biennial of Contemporary Art. This event featured Die Plankton performing a show that was recorded for their "Yorkshire's Answers To The Beatles" live album.

See also
Liverpool and the Black Atlantic

References

External links

 
 Arca
 'Smoke and mirrors: The surreal life and work of René Magritte', The Independent, 10 June 2011

 Tate Liverpool
1988 establishments in England
Art museums established in 1988
Art museums and galleries in Merseyside
Museums in Liverpool
Modern art museums in the United Kingdom
Museums sponsored by the Department for Digital, Culture, Media and Sport
Tourist attractions in Liverpool